Escape Room is a 2019 American psychological horror film directed by Adam Robitel and written by Bragi F. Schut and Maria Melnik. The film stars Taylor Russell, Logan Miller, Deborah Ann Woll, Tyler Labine, Nik Dodani, Jay Ellis, and Yorick van Wageningen, and follows a group of people who are sent to navigate a series of deadly escape rooms.

Development of the film began in August 2017, then under the title The Maze, and the casting process commenced. Filming took place in South Africa in late 2017 through January 2018.

Escape Room was released in the United States on January 4, 2019, by Sony Pictures Entertainment, and grossed over $155million worldwide. The film received mixed reviews from critics, who praised the atmosphere and cast, but criticized the familiar plot and its failure to take full advantage of its premise. A sequel, Escape Room: Tournament of Champions, was released on July 16, 2021.

Plot

Six people from varied backgrounds are presented with a puzzle cube: Zoey, a physics student; Jason, a wealthy daytrader; Ben, a stockboy; Mike, a truck driver; Amanda, an Iraq War veteran; and Danny, an escape room enthusiast. When they solve the puzzle, they are invited to take part in an escape room with a $10,000 prize. The participants arrive at an office block with no greeting, and when Ben tries to leave, the door handle falls off, revealing that the challenge has begun. They escape the first two rooms, a giant heating oven and a winter cabin. After finding the key, however, the rooms become fatal. Danny falls through the ice in an icy room and drowns; Amanda plummets to her death in an upside-down billiards bar where parts of the floor periodically fall into a deep shaft below; Jason shocks Mike to death to solve a puzzle in a hospital room filling up with poisonous gas; and in a room with optical illusions and strobe lights, Ben kills Jason over an antidote required to escape.

Some rooms, through songs playing, coats, and hospital beds, remind the players of them being sole survivors of various disasters; Mike escaped a mine cave-in, Zoey survived a plane crash, Danny survived when his family died of carbon monoxide poisoning, Amanda survived an IED blast, Jason survived a shipwreck in frigid weather, and Ben survived a car accident where his friends died. Zoey realizes that the purpose of the game is to determine which player is the luckiest. Ben, after escaping the last room where a wall moves inwards to crush him, meets the Gamemaster, who controls the game that the Puzzle Maker designed. The Gamemaster explains that each year they lure in players with something in common – college athletes, savants, etc. – and wealthy viewers bet on the result, with the current game luring in sole survivors of previous disasters. The Gamemaster tries to kill Ben, but Zoey intervenes, and together they kill the Gamemaster.

As Ben recovers, Zoey returns to the building with a detective. The police do not believe Zoey, as all evidence of the game has disappeared. They do not believe Ben either, as he was found to have drugs in his system. While looking at the graffiti on the wall, Zoey notices the words "Wootan Yu" and realizes they are an anagram for "No Way Out", suggesting the game is not over. Six months later, Zoey meets up with Ben and shows him newspaper articles that passed off the other players' deaths as everyday accidents. When Ben suggests Zoey should move on, she refuses. She reveals clues to Ben that point to an unlisted building in Manhattan. Ben agrees to go with her. However, the Puzzle Maker is already preparing to make their flight a new deadly game of survival.

Cast
 Taylor Russell as Zoey Davis, a young college student
 Logan Miller as Ben Miller, a stockboy at a grocery store
 Deborah Ann Woll as Amanda Harper, an Iraq War veteran with PTSD
 Tyler Labine as Mike Nolan, a middle-aged truck driver
 Nik Dodani as Danny Khan, an experienced escape room enthusiast
 Jay Ellis as Jason Walker, a stock trader
 Yorick van Wageningen as the Gamemaster

Additionally, Cornelius Geaney Jr. appears as Zoey's professor while Jessica Sutton portrays her roommate, Allison. Russell Crous portrays Charlie, Jason's assistant; Bart Fouche portrays Gary, Ben's boss; Kenneth Fok portrays Detective Li; and Jamie-Lee Money portrays Rosa, a fake flight attendant who works for Minos.

Production
On August 9, 2017, it was announced that the film, then titled The Maze, had commenced casting, based on an original story created by screenwriter Bragi F. Schut. It was set to shoot in South Africa in late 2017. In January 2018, director Robitel told Syfy that production had wrapped and that the film would be released in September 2018, before the film was delayed multiple times to an eventual early 2019 release.

Brian Tyler and John Carey composed the score for the film. The soundtrack was released by Sony Music Entertainment, and includes the full score and a remix of the film's main theme by Madsonik and Kill the Noise, used in the closing credits.

Robitel originally planned the film to end with one of the survivors returning home but decided to change the ending to make the antagonists appear more menacing in anticipation of the sequel.

Release
In May 2018, it was announced that the film was originally going to be released on November 30, 2018. A month later, the film was pushed back two months from its original release date of November 30, 2018, to February 1, 2019, and later was moved up from February 1, 2019, to January 4, 2019.

In Poland, United International Pictures announced that the film's release in the country would be delayed out of respect for the five teenagers who had died in the Koszalin escape room fire, which actually occurred on the day of the film's U.S. release.

Reception

Box office
Escape Room grossed $57million in the United States and Canada, and $98.7million in other territories, for a total worldwide gross of $155.7million, against a production budget of $9million. Deadline Hollywood calculated the net profit of the film to be $46.6million, when factoring together all expenses and revenues.

In the United States and Canada, the film was projected to gross $10–14million from 2,717 theaters in its opening weekend. It made $7.7million on its first day, including $2.3million from Thursday night previews. It went on to debut to $18.2million, surpassing expectations and finishing second, behind Aquaman. The film made $8.9million in its second weekend, dropping 51% and finishing fifth.

Critical response
The website's critical consensus reads, "Escape Room fails to unlock much of the potential in its premise, but what's left is still tense and thrilling enough to offer a passing diversion for suspense fans." On Metacritic, the film has a weighted average score of 48 out of 100, based on 26 critics, indicating "mixed or average reviews". Audiences polled by CinemaScore gave the film a grade of "B" on an A+ to F scale.

Sandy Schaelfer from Screen Rant gave the film 2.5 out of 5 stars, writing that "Escape Room is an entertainingly cheesy and surprisingly innovative B-movie, but suffers when it turns its attention to setting up future sequels."

Sequel

In February 2019, a sequel, Escape Room: Tournament of Champions, was announced as being in active development, with Robitel set to return to direct along with screenwriter Schut and producer Moritz. In October 2019, Collider reported that original cast members Russell and Miller would reprise their roles in the sequel. It was released on July 16, 2021.

References

External links
 
 

2019 films
2019 horror films
2019 science fiction films
2010s psychological horror films
2010s science fiction horror films
American psychological horror films
American science fiction horror films
American science fiction thriller films
Columbia Pictures films
Films about death games
Films produced by Neal H. Moritz
Films scored by Brian Tyler
Films set in Chicago
Films shot in South Africa
Original Film films
2010s English-language films
2010s American films